NorthLight School (Chinese: 北烁学校) is a school located along Towner Road, in Kallang, Singapore. It was established by the Ministry of Education (MOE) for students with difficulties handling the mainstream curriculum in the country. The school started its operations formally in January 2007 to assist students at risk of dropping out of school. Admission to the school is based on at least two failed attempts at the Primary School Leaving Examinations (PSLE). The school also accepts those who have yet to complete secondary education.

History
NorthLight School was established in March 2006 and opened to students the following year. Previously, students who failed the PSLE would enter technical schools, later called Vocational Training Centres (VTCs), for secondary education. However, the attrition was alarmingly high. In 2005, the drop-out rate was 60% and only half of the remaining 40% entered Institute of Technical Education (ITE). Because the minimum entry age for VTCs was fourteen, there was two-year lag between the primary and secondary stages. In response to the problem, the Ministry of Education proposed to open a school to meet the needs of these students who would otherwise be forced to leave school. The Geylang Serai Vocation Training Centre was absorbed into NorthLight.

Campus
The current campus is located at 151 Towner Road, in Kallang. Previously, the Balestier branch of the Institute of Technical Education (ITE) was based at the Kallang campus.

Before NorthLight School moved to its current location in Kallang in 2015, it was situated on Dunman Road in Geylang.

Curriculum
The curriculum draws its inspirations from the Life Learning Academy in San Francisco. The curriculum, primarily vocational, emphasises on developing emotional strength and instilling life-skills in the students. The curriculum includes a wide range of vocational options. In addition, there is a 8-week-long industrial attachment to ensure the relevance of the skills picked up at school to real time employment needs. There is a Co-Curricular Activity (CCA) programme to cater to the needs of students beyond the academics. The school has full-time, in-house counsellors to assist students troubled by social and emotional challenges.

References

External links

Independent schools in Singapore
Special education schools in Singapore
Kallang